CONCORD (European NGO Confederation for Relief and Development) is the European NGO confederation for Relief and Development. It was founded in 2003 and is the main NGO interlocutor with the EU institutions on development policy.  it has 28 national associations, 18 international networks and 2 associate member representing 1,800 NGOs which are supported by millions of citizens across Europe. Its members are national NGO platforms and international NGO networks. Its secretariat is based in Brussels. 

The stated goal of the Confederation is to enhance the impact of European development NGOs by combining expertise and accountability. Since 2003, CONCORD has reviewed and protested the EU's policies and practices relation to overseas aid and its commitment to the UN Millennium Development Goals, policy coherence for development and funding issues.

EU Development Policy
The EU and its Member States are the world's biggest donors of official development assistance. A major area of work for EU development policy operates within the Cotonou agreement which establishes a relationship between the EU and African, Caribbean and Pacific states related to development policy.
EU action in the field of development is based on the European Consensus on Development, signed on 20 December 2005, whereby EU Member States, the Council, the European Parliament and the European Commission agreed to a common EU vision of development.

EU partnerships and dialogue with developing countries promote respect for human rights, fundamental freedoms, peace, democracy, good governance, and gender equality, the rule of law, solidarity and justice through global education. European Community's contribution is focused in certain areas of intervention, responding to the needs of partner countries.

Publications
CONCORD publishes AidWatch, an annual report on the EU's aid policy. In 2011, the AidWatch report criticised EU members states for increasingly tying overseas development aid to specific domestic and foreign policy goals, inflating aid by 5billion Euros.

CONCORD also publishes a report every 2 years on Policy Coherence for Development (PCD), a legal provision under the EU Lisbon Treaty. PCD aims to ensure that the external impacts of other EU policies do not undermine the aims and objectives of EU development cooperation.

In 2010, CONCORD published its Narrative on Development. The report outlines that European Union Development policies should not pursue unilateral European interests. Legally, they are to support sustainable and human development in developing countries.

Partners
At global level, CONCORD is actively involved in the Open Forum for CSO Development Effectiveness, the Beyond 2015 campaign, The Humanitarian Forum international network of NGOs and BetterAid. Through these collaborations CONCORD engages with similar NGO networks from South America, Asia and Africa. It's also a partner of Arab NGO Network for Development (ANND) and Mesa

References

International organizations based in Europe
International development agencies
International organisations based in Belgium